The first USS Sierra (ID-1634) was a troop transport of the United States Navy that served during World War I and its immediate aftermath.

Construction and acquisition

SS Sierra was constructed as a commercial passenger ship in 1900 by William Cramp & Sons in Philadelphia for the San Francisco to Australia service via Hawaii of the Oceanic Steamship Company. The ship was the first of a series of three to be built for the line with the others being Sonoma and Ventura.

The U.S. Navy acquired her from the John D. Spreckel Brothers Company in San Francisco, California, on 27 May 1918 for use as a troop transport during World War I and assigned her the identification number 1634. After conversion work was complete, she was commissioned as USS Sierra (ID-1634) on 1 July 1918.

U.S. Navy career

Sierra was assigned to transatlantic service upon commissioning, and she transported troops from the United States to France until the end of World War I on 11 November 1918. After the war, she engaged in the reverse process of bringing American troops home from Europe for another eleven months.

Decommissioning and disposal
Sierra was decommissioned on 1 October 1919. On the same day, her name was stricken from the Navy list and she was returned to her owners.

Later career
As SS Sierra, the ship returned to commercial passenger service. She later was renamed SS Gdansk.

Gallery

Notes

References

External links
 
 
 

Unique transports of the United States Navy
World War I transports of the United States
1900 ships
Ships built by William Cramp & Sons